Teeraphong Utaida (born 7 June 1993), who boxes as  Fahlan Sakkreerin Jr. (ฟ้าลั่นจูเนียร์ ศักดิ์กรีรินทร์), Fahlanjunior Kasetphatthana (ฟ้าลั่นจูเนียร์ เกษตรพัฒนา), is a Thai professional boxer in Mini flyweight and Junior flyweight division.

Biography & career
Teeraphong (nicknamed: Champ; แชมป์) is the son of Fahlan Sakkreerin, a retired boxer who won IBF Mini flyweight and WBF Flyweight world champions in the 90's. He loves to boxing and beginning from Muay Thai but not very successful, so he changed to professional boxing under Kiat Kreerin Promotion like his father at the age of 17. He debut by KO in the first round against fellow-countryman Wisanlek Sithsaithong in 2010. And before that he also competed in amateur boxing tournament presented by PTT.

He became more known by KO in the third round over Ryo Miyazaki, a Japanese boxer who is a former WBA Minimumweight world champion on December 31, 2013 at Bodymaker Colosseum, Osaka, Japan. Ever since Ekarat "Jimmy" Chaichotchuang, his manager so hopefully he will be the world champion like his father.

On April 22, 2015 he challenge IBF Mini flyweight world champion with Katsunari Takayama, a Japanese holder at Osaka Prefectural Gymnasium, Osaka as a result, he was defeated in the ninth round with the scores of 86–85, 90–81, 87–84. After Takayama, there was a crack in his face that couldn't be fight. Even though in the eighth round, he used punches until Takayama's face was bleeding, not a headbutt or accident according to the rules of IBF. Although his manager is trying to file a protest to IBF in order to have a rematch but it doesn't work.

After that, he was promoted to Light flyweight and won IBF Pan Pacific Light flyweight title by wins over Lester Abutan, a Filipino boxer on April 22, 2016 at 7th Infantry Division, Amphoe Mae Rim, Chiang Mai province.

On November 26, 2016 he challenge IBF Junior flyweight interim champion as he is a ranked #3 with Milan Melindo, a Filipino boxer who is a ranked #6 at Cebu Coliseum, Cebu City, Cebu, Philippines. But it appears that he was defeated by a unanimous decision 117–111, 115–113, 115–113 at the end of the final round.

On October 15, 2017 he faced Felix Alvarado, a Nicaraguan boxer at Puerto Salvador Allende, Managua in the eliminator fight for the winner to challenge IBF Junior flyweight against Milan Melindo. He is the first Thai boxer to fight here in 49 years, after Chartchai Chionoi vs. Ratón Mojica in 1968. But it appears that he was Alvarado's punches unilaterally, he was knocked down in the late first round and in the third round he was right hook until finally knocked out.

Boxing style
Teeraphong  is a boxer style. Unlike his father, who is a fighter style.

Titles in Boxing
Regional/International Titles:
IBF Pan Pacific Junior flyweight Champion (April 2016) (108 lbs)
IBF Asia Junior flyweight Champion  (December 2014) (April 2017) (2x)(108 lbs)

References

External links
 

Living people
1993 births
Mini-flyweight boxers
Fahlan Sakkreerin Jr.
Fahlan Sakkreerin Jr.
Light-flyweight boxers